Stingy may refer to one of the following:
A miser
The name of a fictional puppet character on LazyTown
 Stingy (song), single by Ginuwine